Sheffield is a neighborhood of Kansas City, Missouri, United States.

A post office called Sheffield was established in 1888, and remained in operation until 1902. The community's name is a transfer from Sheffield, England.

References

Neighborhoods in Kansas City, Missouri